Nancy Mee (1951) is an American sculptor and glass artist.

Her work is included in the collections of the Seattle Art Museum, the Tacoma Art Museum and the Portland Art Museum.

References

1951 births
20th-century American women artists
21st-century American women artists
Living people
American glass artists